Salvia urticifolia (nettleleaf sage, nettle-leaved sage, wild sage) is a herbaceous perennial native to the southeastern United States. The lower lip has three lobes, with a pair of white marks coming from the throat. The leaves are crenate—similar to the leaves of Urtica species.

Notes

External links
 Salvia urticifolia at Vanderbilt University Arboretum database

urticifolia
Flora of Florida
Plants described in 1753
Taxa named by Carl Linnaeus